Marco Miltkau (born 18 August 1990) is a German field hockey player who plays as a forward for Dutch club Klein Zwitserland and the German national team.

Personal life
Marco Miltkau was born and raised in Hamburg, Germany. He started playing hockey at the age of four, introduced to the sport by his father who was a well known coach.

Club career
Miltkau played for Braunschweiger THC and UHC Hamburg in the German Bundesliga. In 2012 he switched from UHC Hamburg to Rot-Weiss Köln. In 2019 he left Germany to play for La Gantoise in the Men's Belgian Hockey League. In June 2020, it was announced he joined Klein Zwitserland in the Dutch Hoofdklasse for the 2020–21 season.

International career

Indoor
Miltkau was a member of the German indoor team at the 2018 Indoor World Cup in Berlin, Germany. At the tournament, the team won a silver medal.

Outdoor
In 2012, Miltkau made his debut for the senior national team. Shortly after he played in his first major tournament at the Champions Trophy in Melbourne, Australia.

Since his debut, Miltkau has been a regular inclusion in the national side. During his career he has medalled three times with the national team; gold and silver at the 2013 and 2015 EuroHockey Nations Championships respectively, and bronze at the 2016 Champions Trophy.

Miltkau represented Germany in the inaugural tournament of the FIH Pro League from January–June 2019.

References

External links

1990 births
Living people
Field hockey players from Hamburg
German male field hockey players
Male field hockey forwards
2018 Men's Hockey World Cup players
Uhlenhorster HC players
Rot-Weiss Köln players
HC Klein Zwitserland players
Men's Hoofdklasse Hockey players
Men's Belgian Hockey League players
Expatriate field hockey players
German expatriate sportspeople in Belgium
German expatriate sportspeople in the Netherlands
2018 FIH Indoor Hockey World Cup players
2023 Men's FIH Hockey World Cup players